The Seym or Seim is a west-flowing river in Russia and Ukraine. It is the largest tributary of the Desna.

Places on the river are: Kursk, Kurchatov, Rylsk, Ukrainian border, Putyvl, Baturyn, junction with the Desna which continues west and south past Chernihiv to Kyiv.

References

Rivers of Belgorod Oblast
Rivers of Kursk Oblast
Rivers of Sumy Oblast
Russia–Ukraine border